Alekseyevka is a rural locality (a village) in Kumertau, Bashkortostan, Russia. The population was 336 as of 2010. There are 6 streets.

References 

Rural localities in Kumertau